Gersi Delia (born 2 June 1992) is an Albanian footballer who is currently a free agent.

References

1992 births
Living people
Albanian footballers
Association football forwards
FK Dinamo Tirana players
Żejtun Corinthians F.C. players
SR Delémont players
FC Laufen players
Kategoria Superiore players
Albanian expatriate footballers
Albanian expatriate sportspeople in Malta
Expatriate footballers in Malta
Albanian expatriate sportspeople in Switzerland
Expatriate footballers in Switzerland
Albanian expatriate sportspeople in Germany
Expatriate footballers in Germany